Clubul Sportiv Municipal Jiul Petroșani, commonly known as Jiul Petroșani, simply as Jiul, is a professional football club based in Petroșani, Hunedoara County, founded in 1919 under the name of CAM Petroșani. Jiul Petroșani is one of the oldest active clubs in Romania. Founded before teams such as Steaua București, Dinamo București or Rapid București, Jiul, at its best, was ranked 2nd (1924–25) in the top-flight. For most of its existence, Jiuel has been a constant presence in the first two tiers of the Romanian football league system, making it a traditional club in the country. In 1990, the closure of the Jiu Valley mines, the main engine of the local economy, led to the decay of Jiuel, annually putting the team in danger of bankruptcy.

History

Early years and first performances (1919–1930)

Football was introduced to Jiu Valley in the early 20th century and was initially played in Petroșani at the present-day location of the Dâlja mine. Despite distrust and hostility from local coal miners, whose trade drove the local economy, a club was officially organized by Ion Winklehner, general manager of the Petroșani Society mines, under the name Clubul Atletic al Minelor Petroșani (Petroșani Mines Athletic Club) (CAMP). Early coaches included Iosif Keiling, Carol Krausz, Wilhelm Spitzer, and János Kovezdi.

In 1922, CAMP entered the District of Arad championship, where they played against teams from the Hunedoara Region. The club's owners brought in players from outside of Petroșani to make them a competitive team — these players included Iosif Klein, L. Kiminich, Adalbert Dankó, and Z. Veszprémy. In its first season, CAMP ranked third after AAC Arad and CS Vulcan. In the 1924-25 edition, they won the championship, now under the name Uniunea Cluburilor Sportive ale Societății Petroșani (Sports Club Association of Petroșani Society) (UCASP), adopted after merging with CS Vulcan in 1924. UCASP participated in the final stage of the 1924–25 Divizia A season after eliminating Universitatea Cluj and Jahn Cernăuți, but lost the final (1–5) against Chinezul Timișoara. Gheorghe Péterffy, Elemér Berkessy, and Ștefan Messner joined the team.

After the merger with CS Vulcan was reversed in 1926, UCASP merged with Jiul Lupeni and adopted its name. New standout players included Ioan Kiss and Aurel Guga. They participated in the national final of the 1927-28 season but lost (2-3) on 29 July 1928 against Colțea Brașov. This merger was also reversed and in 1929, Petroșani's team took on the name Jiul, inspired by the Jiu River, which passes through the city.

Road to Divizia A (1930–1937)
Due to the popularity of Divizia A, which began in 1932–33, a second league, Divizia B, was established. The 1934-35 season began with five series based on geographic criteria. Jiul Petroșani was ranked 1st in the second series of Divizia B's first season. Rules at the time stated that a promotion tournament would be held between the winners of the five series. Jiul Petroșani won the tournament and went on to play a promotion/relegation playoff game against the bottom-ranked team, AMEFA Arad, in Divizia A, finishing 0-2 at Arad and 0-0 at home. Jiul Petroșani's top players at this point included Gusti Emerich, Géza Medve, Remus Radu, Szulle, Gheorghe Péterffy, and Gheorghe Vâjdea.

The 1936-37 season came with the introduction of Divizia C, the third tier, meaning that four teams from the two series in Divizia B were promoted. These teams were Phoenix Baia Mare, Vulturii Textila Lugoj, Olimpia Satu Mare, and Jiul Petroșani. Coach Rudolf Jeny led the team, including players Kiss, Bredan, Zastulka, and Gheorghe Vâjdea, into the club's first season in Divizia A.

Years of consolidation (1937–1966)

Until the end of World War II, Jiul Petroșani oscillated between Divizia A (1937-38) and Divizia B (1938-41). Top players remained static: Gheorghe Vâjdea, Gusti Emmerich, and Géza Medve, along with Ernest Skovrán, who also played for Romania B. The club won the 2nd series of the second league at the end of the 1940-41 season but the championship was interrupted by the war and was put on hold until 1946. Jiul Petroșani advanced back to Divizia A. In the 1948-49 season, Jiul Petroșani achieved its best performance yet: they placed 3rd in the league after ICO Oradea and CFR București, despite having completed the prior season in 10th place. The success was due in part to acquiring Ion Panait,  Costică Marinescu, and Tudor Paraschiva. Tiberiu Bone was also part of this squad.

Between 1950 and 1956, Divizia A played by the Soviet model in a spring-autumn system. The club continued ranking in the middle of league for several years under coaches Ion "Jean" Lăpușneanu and Andrei Sepci and with players Aurel Crâsnic, Tudor Paraschiva, Ștefan Coidum, Iuliu Farkaș I, and Ion Panait. At the end of the 1959–60 season, however, they were relegated back to Divizia B after 13 years in Divizia A. The squad only spent one season there before being promoted again under Coach Bazil Marian after defeating CSM Baia Mare in the series championship. After returning to Divizia A for the 1961-62 season, they were sent back down for the 1962-66 seasons. The squad focused on strengthening itself during that period and acquired players such as Florea Martinovici, Cornel Pavlovici, Emil Dumitriu, Petre Libardi, and Andrei Stocker. Coach Eugen Mladin took them back to the top league for the 1966-67 season.

A great period (1966–1985)

Jiul Petroșani spent eight years in Divizia A, jumping between positions: 8th in 1966-67 and 1967-68; 6th in 1968-69; 7th in 1969-70; 13th in 1970-71; 12th in 1971-72; 10th in 1972-73; and 15th in 1973-1974. Under Coach Traian Ivănescu, however, the squad — including players Ion Nițu, Gogu Tonca, Andrei Stocker, Alexandru Nagy, Petre Libardi, Árpád Szűcs, Gheorghe Mulțescu, Adalbert Rozsnyai, and Mihai Stoichiță — defeated Politehnica Timișoara 4-2 in the 1973–74 Romanian Cup final and brought home the trophy for the first time. They were eligible for the European Cup for the first time but lost 2-3 in the first round on aggregate against Dundee United. Jiul Petroșani remained in the first league and jumped up to 5th place in the 1976-77 season under Coach Gheorghe Ene and with players including Iosif Cavai, Dragu Bădin, Grigore Ciupitu, Augustin Deleanu, Traian Stoica, Ionel Augustin, Gheorghe Mulțescu, and Florea Dumitrache

After losing their original stadium after a fire in 1975, the team's new stadium opened in Lunca Jiului park in 1982. At the end of the 1984-85 season, however, Jiul Petroșani was relegated back to the second league after 19 seasons. Three of the team's coaches were sacked and 24 players used, many of them suspected of match fixing.

Ups and downs (1985–2002)

Jiul Petroșani continued to oscillate between leagues over the next 15 years. While Coach Gheorghe Mulțescu, a former Jiul player, got the team promoted back to Divizia A following the 1985-86 season, they fell again in 1987. They remained in Divizia B for two years until 1988-1989, when they were promoted. The two subsequent years in the first league were the height of players like Ioan Varga, Marian Bâcu, Horațiu Lasconi, Aristică Cioabă, Ion Sburlea, and Damian Militaru. At the end of the 1990-91 season, however, not only were they relegated, but they also spent several seasons in the middle of Divizia B, with 13th place in 1993-94 and 7th place in 1994-95. The team managed to turn itself around following the intervention of Miron Cozma, leader of the Miners Union League of the Jiu Valley.

Under Coach Ion "Liță" Dumitru and with standout players Leontin Toader, Aristică Cioabă, Marin Tudorache, and Fănel Țîră, Jiul Petroșani returned to the first league for the 1995-96 season. Ion Bivolaru, Cristian Pușcaș, Romulus Bealcu, Tudorel Zamfirescu and Tiberiu Csik joined the club over the next two years. Jiul was relegated at the end of 1997-98 with its most crushing defeat in club history: they finished the season with 10 points and only three victories out of 34 matches. Club ownership changed hands over the next several seasons and the team struggled; even after hiring experienced coach Ioan Sdrobis, Jiul Petroșani was further relegated to Divizia C for the first time in its history at the end of the 2001–02 season.

The last shine of the miners (2002–2007)

Despite its disastrous 2001-02 season, Jiul Petroșani only spent one year in Divizia C, winning the sixth series with 8 points over CS Certej. In 2003-04, Jiul Petroșani continued to push forward with determination and finished 2nd, just one point behind CFR Cluj. They finished the subsequent season in the third series tied with Gaz Metan Mediaș and were promoted back to Divizia A due to their better goal average. Coach Gheorghe Borugă's team advanced with players like Dumitru Hotoboc, Cătălin Mulțescu, Cornel Irina, Iosif Kalai, Mihai Pintilii, Szabolcs Perenyi, Vasile Ciocoi, Mircea Voicu, Damian Militaru, Gabriel Apetri, Adrian Drida, Adrian Dulcea, and Marian Pâcleșan.  

The next two seasons saw a number of administrative changes and issues within the team and the club went through two different coaches: Ionuț Chirilă followed by Aurel Șunda. Despite acquiring Alin Paleacu, Florentin Dumitru, Alin Ilin, and Laurențiu Diniță, Jiul Petroșani finished 18th at the very bottom of the league with 20 points and the longest winless run (12 games) of the season. They returned to the second league, now called Liga II.

Financial problems and the decline (2007–present)
The decline of the mining industry in the Jiu Valley, the relegation, and internal drama saw the team struggle for several years, especially financially. Player Mihai Lungan accused Alin Simota, owner of Jiul Petroșani, of sending his bodyguards to beat him up after Lungan attempted to terminate his contract. The club returned to the middle of the second league, placing 6th in 2007–08, 10th in 2008–09, and 16th in 2009–10 after being excluded from the championship. The exclusion put even more financial strain on the already stretched-thin budget and Jiul Petroșani dropped down to Liga IV for the 2010-11 season. They finished at the top of the league, five points above Minerul Uricani in 2nd, but lost 0-1 in the promotion match against Flacăra Făget from Timis County. Despite this, Jiul was able to join Liga III due to a shortage of teams and finished 5th.

Alin Simota left the team during the 2012-13 winter break, designating its ownership to the Petroșani Municipality. The city, however, refused to take over and Jiul was forced to withdraw from Liga III and re-join Liga IV. In 2014, the club was moved to the government-owned Municipal Sports Club and funding became even scarcer. As such, they have continued to struggle, placing 8th in 2013–14, 9th in 2014–15, 13th in 2015–16, 9th in 2016–17, 12th in 2017–18 and 9th in 2018–19. Despite the changes during the COVID-19 pandemic and finishing 12th in the 2019-20 season, Jiul Petroșani was promoted and finished 8th in the seventh round of Liga III's 2020-21 season. They managed to stay within the third league during the 2021-22 season but have qualified for the play-out round in 2022-23.

Grounds

The first Stadionul Jiul was built in 1922 and was used until it caught fire on 25 May 1975 during a match against Politehnica Iași. The match was expected to be tense, as the teams were fighting to gain the upper hand in Divizia A's relegation zone. The fire started in the 53-year-old stands at the 14th minute. There were no casualties but Jiul Petroșani was forced to move out of the stadium. The plot is now home to Petroșani Hotel and Carol Schreter Central Park.

The club's new stadium opened in 1982 as the only stadium in the country with two covered stands. An electronic scoreboard, an athletic track around the pitch, and four training grounds belonging to the sports complex were also added. The stadium capacity was initially 30,000 but in 2005, after Jiul Petroșani was promoted to Divizia A, the stadium was renovated and, due to a new electronic scoreboard and plastic chairs, capacity dropped to 15,500. The stadium was renamed Stadionul Petre Libardi, in the honor of Petre Libardi, former captain of Jiul, on the club's 100-year anniversary in 2019.

Honours

Domestic

Leagues
Liga I
Runners-up (1): 1924–25
Liga II
Winners (8): 1934–35, 1940–41, 1960–61, 1965–66, 1985–86, 1988–89, 1995–96, 2004–05
Runners-up (3): 1936–37, 1987–88, 2003–04
Liga III
Winners (1): 2002–03
Liga IV – Hunedoara County
Winners (2): 2010–11, 2019–20

Cups
Cupa României
Winners (1): 1973–74
Runners-up (1): 1971–72

European
Balkans Cup
Runners-up (1): 1977–78

European record

Players

First team squad

Out of loan

Club officials

Board of directors

Current technical staff

League history

Notable former players
The footballers enlisted below have had international cap(s) for their respective countries at junior and/or senior level and/or more than 100 caps for CSM Jiul Petroșani.

  Cristian Albeanu
  Gabriel Apetri
  Justin Apostol
  Ionel Augustin
  Dragu Bădin
  Eric Bicfalvi
  Marian Bâcu
  Elemér Berkessy
  Tiberiu Bone
  Iosif Cavai
  Grigore Ciupitu
  Aurel Crâsnic
  Augustin Deleanu
  Florea Dumitrache
  Florentin Dumitru
  Iuliu Farkaș I
  Aurel Guga
  Daniel Huza
  Cornel Irina
  Traian Ivănescu
  Horațiu Lasconi
  Petre Libardi
  Constantin Marinescu
  Florea Martinovici
  Salif Nogo
  Damian Militaru
  Gheorghe Mulțescu
  Victor Niculescu
  Ion Nițu
  Nicolae Negrilă
  Marian Pâcleșan
  Ion Panait
  Tudor Paraschiva
  Cornel Pavlovici
  Mihai Pintilii
  Mircea Popa
  Octavian Popescu
  Sergiu Radu
  Adalbert Rozsnyai
  Ion Sburlea
  Gabriel Stan
  Andrei Stocker
  Mihai Stoichiță
  Vasile Suciu
  Daniel Timofte
  Gogu Tonca
  Marin Tudorache
  Ioan Varga
  Ion Voicu

Notable former managers

 Coloman Braun-Bogdan
 Ștefan Coidum
 Ion Dumitru
 Ion Ionescu
 Traian Ionescu
 Eugen Iordache
 Rudolf Jeny
 Dumitru Marcu
 Viorel Mateianu
 Eugen Mladin
 Virgil Mărdărescu
 Constantin Oțet
 Titus Ozon
 Andrei Sepci
 Ioan Sdrobiș
 Adalbert Szabo
 Marin Tudorache

References

External links

 
Football clubs in Hunedoara County
Petroșani
Association football clubs established in 1919
1919 establishments in Romania
Liga I clubs
Liga II clubs
Liga III clubs
Liga IV clubs
Jiul Petroșani